Franco Trincavelli (7 June 1935 – 10 November 1983) was an Italian competition rower and Olympic champion.

He received a gold medal in coxed fours at the 1956 Summer Olympics in Melbourne, together with Alberto Winkler, Angelo Vanzin, Romano Sgheiz and Ivo Stefanoni.

He received a bronze medal at the 1960 Summer Olympics in Rome.

References

1935 births
1983 deaths
Italian male rowers
Olympic rowers of Italy
Olympic gold medalists for Italy
Olympic bronze medalists for Italy
Rowers at the 1956 Summer Olympics
Rowers at the 1960 Summer Olympics
Olympic medalists in rowing
Medalists at the 1960 Summer Olympics
Medalists at the 1956 Summer Olympics
European Rowing Championships medalists